The Udawalawe Dam is a large irrigation dam in Udawalawe, in the Southern Province of Sri Lanka.

The water level of the reservoir is controlled by the five tainter gate spillways located at the eastern end of the dam, with two additional spillways located more towards to the centre of the dam.

See also 

 Electricity in Sri Lanka
 List of dams and reservoirs in Sri Lanka
 List of power stations in Sri Lanka

References 

Hydroelectric power stations in Sri Lanka
Dams in Sri Lanka
Buildings and structures in Monaragala District
Embankment dams